Gloucestershire College (GC or Gloscol) is a college of further and higher education in the county of Gloucestershire, United Kingdom.

It offers a range of education and training programmes, which include:

 Apprenticeships and higher apprenticeships
Professional and technical qualifications
 Higher education
 Short courses for businesses
 Part-time and evening courses
 English for overseas students

History
In 1969, the two branches of Gloucestershire College of Art in Cheltenham and Stroud amalgamated with the Gloucester City College of Art to form the Gloucestershire College of Art and Design (GCAD).

Gloucestershire College of Arts and Technology was formed in 1980 from the merger of four county (Local Education Authority) colleges, Gloucestershire College of Education, Gloucestershire College of Art and Design, Gloucester City College of Technology, and North Gloucestershire College of Technology. In 1990 GlosCAT divided its provision forming a separate Higher Education Trust to go forward with a separate merger to become Cheltenham & Gloucester College of Higher Education and then the University of Gloucestershire. It maintained the remaining part as a Local Authority institution, which became a Further Education Corporation.

In early 2011 Gloucestershire College merged with the former Royal Forest of Dean College and thus acquired the sites of the college to safeguard the provision of further education in the region.

A 10-year Memorandum of Understanding has been signed by the University of Gloucestershire's Vice-Chancellor and the Principals of Gloucestershire College and South Gloucestershire and Stroud College to support access to higher education locally in Gloucestershire.

Campuses

Gloucestershire College has three main campuses at large purpose-built facilities in Cheltenham, Gloucester and the Forest of Dean. Its Employer Training & Apprenticeships team is based at the Gloucester Campus.

The Forest of Dean campus relocated from Five Acres to Cinderford in 2018. The modern, lakeside facility was built as part of the £100m Cinderford Northern Quarter regeneration project.

Cheltenham Campus

Cheltenham Campus, situated on Princess Elizabeth Way (formerly in The Park), is home to Cheltenham Fashion Academy; the commercial Number One Restaurant and Graduations at Cheltenham Spa salon; a coffee shop; nursery; a new library; purpose-built construction and building services workshops; and the international student hub.

Courses available in Cheltenham include accounting; apprenticeships; art and design; business; catering and hospitality; counselling; ESOL, EFL and CELTA; fashion; hairdressing and beauty; health and social care, early years; languages; and teacher training.

Gloucester Campus

Gloucester Campus relocated to a brownfield site within Gloucester Docks in 2007 and the new building, situated on Llanthony Road, won the Civic Trust Award for Best Climate Friendly Scheme in July 2008.

The campus is home to a purpose-built Construction Street; Taylor Theatre; a commercial salon and spa; a coffee shop; nursery; dance, TV, photography and recording studios; an Enterprise Lab; purpose-built aircraft simulation room; sports hall; library; and workshops for engineering, construction and motor vehicle.

Courses available in Gloucester include apprenticeships; arts, media, music and performing arts; business, administration, management and finance; construction and building services; counselling; engineering; ESOL; hairdressing, beauty and holistic therapies; health, care and early years; IT and computing; motor vehicle; sport and public services; teacher training and education; and travel and tourism.

Forest of Dean Campus
The former campus based in Coleford closed in August 2018.

Since September 2018, a new £13 million pound campus is based in Cinderford, which offers a background of the forest. There is: a lake at the back of the building, a balcony giving out views, the view restaurant, construction room and a graduations beauty salon.

Courses available include Apprenticeships; Arts, Media, Music and Performing Arts; Catering and Hospitality; Construction and Building Services; Counselling; Finance; Independent Living; Hairdressing; Beauty and Holistic Therapies; Health, Care and Early Years; IT and Computing; Sport and Outdoor Education; and Teacher Training and Education.

Since September, 2019 GC and Dene Magna are in partnership, which helps students from the whole of the Forest of Dean to have A-levels reintroduced at the Cinderford campus.

Students

The college caters mainly for the 16–18 age group. It also offers higher education up to and including HND, HNC and foundation degree levels, NVQ Level 4 and higher apprenticeships.

There are approximately 4,000 full-time and 10,000 part-time students enrolled at Gloucestershire College.

Partnerships

Gloucestershire College has formed strategic partnerships with the University of Gloucestershire, the University of the West of England and Birmingham City University to offer a range of foundation degrees, including Early Years Studies; Health and Complementary Therapies; Public Services; Salon Management; Therapeutic Counselling; Electronic and Computer Engineering; and Health and Social Care.

References

External links

Education in Cheltenham
Education in Gloucester
Further education colleges in Gloucestershire
Recipients of Civic Trust Awards